The Cray T3E was Cray Research's second-generation massively parallel supercomputer architecture, launched in late November 1995. The first T3E was installed at the Pittsburgh Supercomputing Center in 1996. Like the previous Cray T3D, it was a fully distributed memory machine using a 3D torus topology interconnection network. The T3E initially used the DEC Alpha 21164 (EV5) microprocessor and was designed to scale from 8 to 2,176 Processing Elements (PEs).  Each PE had between 64 MB and 2 GB of DRAM and a 6-way interconnect router with a payload bandwidth of 480 MB/s in each direction.  Unlike many other MPP systems, including the T3D, the T3E was fully self-hosted and ran the UNICOS/mk distributed operating system with a GigaRing I/O subsystem integrated into the torus for network, disk and tape I/O.

The original T3E (retrospectively known as the T3E-600) had a 300 MHz processor clock. Later variants, using the faster 21164A (EV56) processor,  comprised the T3E-900 (450 MHz), T3E-1200 (600 MHz), T3E-1200E (with improved memory and interconnect performance) and T3E-1350 (675 MHz). The T3E was available in both air-cooled (AC) and liquid-cooled (LC) configurations. AC systems were available with 16 to 128 user PEs, LC systems with 64 to 2048 user PEs.

A 1480-processor T3E-1200 was the first supercomputer to achieve a performance of more than 1 teraflops running a computational science application, in 1998. 

After Cray Research was acquired by Silicon Graphics in February 1996, development of new Alpha-based systems was stopped. While providing the -900, -1200 and -1200E upgrades to the T3E, in the long term Silicon Graphics intended Cray T3E users to migrate to the Origin 3000, a MIPS-based distributed shared memory computer, introduced in 2000. However, the T3E continued in production after SGI sold the Cray business the same year.

See also
 History of supercomputing

References

External links
 Top500 description of T3E
 Inside Cray T3E-900 Serial Number 6702, (link to updated copy)
 Performance Analysis of the CRAY T3E-1200E, Edward Anderson, Lockheed Martin Services Inc., 1999, (link to archived copy)

Computer-related introductions in 1995
T3e
Supercomputers